Revolutionary Vanguard (Communist Proletarian) (in Spanish: , abbreviated VR-PC) was a Maoist-oriented political party in Peru founded in 1977 by Eduardo Figari and Julio César Mezzich. It was formed through a split in Revolutionary Vanguard. In 1978 a faction mainly active in the peasant movement around Mezzich and Lino Quintanillo left the VR-PC and most of its members joined individually the Shining Path.

Figari served as the general secretary of the VR-PC. In October 1979 VR-PC was a co-founder of the electoral coalition Union of the Revolutionary Left (UNIR).  was the organ of the Central Committee of VR-PC.

References

Political parties established in 1977
Defunct political parties in Peru
Communist parties in Peru
Defunct Maoist parties